Laugharne   is a town on the south coast of Carmarthenshire, Wales, lying on the estuary of the River Tâf.

The ancient borough of Laugharne Township with its Corporation and Charter is a unique survival in Wales. In a predominantly English-speaking area, just on the Landsker Line, the community is bordered by those of Llanddowror, St Clears, Llangynog and Llansteffan. It had a population at the 2011 census of 1,222. 

Laugharne Township electoral ward also includes the communities of Eglwyscummin, Pendine and Llanddowror.

Dylan Thomas, who lived in Laugharne from 1949 until his death in 1953, famously described it as a "timeless, mild, beguiling island of a town". It is generally accepted as the inspiration for the fictional town of Llareggub in Under Milk Wood. Thomas confirmed on two occasions that his play was based on Laugharne   although topographically it is also similar to New Quay where he briefly lived.

History

 
Throughout much of the Prehistoric period human activity in the Laugharne area was centred on Coygan Bluff, a steep-sided limestone peninsula overlooking the now submerged coastal plain to the south. A natural cave  on the southeast face of the promontory was excavated five times between 1865 and 1965  yielding significant evidence that its chambers acted as a temporary shelter for groups of hunter-gathers moving through the landscape over 50,000 years ago  and later material in the form of flint tools indicating an extended series of occupations from the Mesolithic and Neolithic periods. These discoveries suggest that the Township  is probably the oldest, still inhabited settlement in Wales. Contemporary artefacts from the Mousterian period have also been found at nearby Paviland and Long Hole caves along with older hominin remains at Bontnewydd but, unlike at Laugharne, the communities associated with them are long vanished.

In the 4th century BC, a promontory fort was built at the summit of the hill. During the Bronze Age Coygan camp is recorded as the site of an open settlement with funerary and ritual activity shown by a short-cist contracted inhumation. Further finds at a nearby round barrow on Laugharne Burrows  together with Beaker burials at Plashett  and Orchard Park  confirm a more permanent community. Excavation in the 1960s of the defended enclosure on Coygan revealed two huts contemporary with the defensive bank and ditch and a significant quantity of pottery recovered dating to the late 3rd century AD indicating the site was occupied deep into the Romano-British period. Another significant Iron Age settlement has also been identified at Glan-y-Mor Fort  in the north of the township.

The Laugharne hoard of over 2000 coins  and Roman bath remains found at Island House, together with the   substantial Romano-British group of imported sixth-century finewares, coinage and glass from Coygan Camp, described as "one of the richest from a native settlement in south-west Wales", are all part of a concentration of traditional ‘Roman’ finds in the area. As evidence of activity from the period is generally scarce, these discoveries confirm the site as one of  importance  and suggest that it continued to be a high status settlement well beyond the Roman occupation. A 6th century inscribed stone lies within Llansadwrnen church to the north, considered to be an outlying burial site of the more important secular settlement on Coygan. Laugharne Church, which contains a 9th century Celtic slab stone  and where a long cist grave cemetery has also been recorded, is thought to be a more likely early ecclesiastical site in the immediate area.

In the Early Middle Ages Laugharne was the main settlement in the area and home to the Lords of Laugharne. It was a commote of Gwarthaf, the largest of the seven cantrefi of the Kingdom of Dyfed in southwest Wales, later to be ruled by the Princes of Deheuberth. In 1093, Deheubarth was seized by the Normans following Rhys ap Tewdwrs death. In the early 12th century, grants of lands were made to Flemings by King Henry I when their country was flooded. In 1116, when Gruffydd ap Rhys (the son and heir of Rhys ap Tewdwr) returned from self-imposed exile, the king arranged for the land to be fortified against him; according to the Brut y Tywysogyon, Robert Courtemain constructed a castle at Laugharne in that year (this is the earliest reference to any castle at or near Laugharne). Courtemain may be the Robertus cum tortis manibus mentioned in the Book of Llandaff, as one of a number of specifically named Norman magnates within the vicinity of the Llandaff diocese, who received a letter from Pope Callixtus II complaining about deprivations they had inflicted on diocesan church property; in the letter, the Pope warns he would confirm Bishop Urban's proclamations against them, if they do not rectify matters. The Brut states that Courtemain appointed a man named Bleddyn ap Cedifor as castellan; Bleddyn was the son of Cedifor ap Gollwyn, descendant and heir of the earlier kings of Dyfed (as opposed to those of Deheubarth). The castle was originally known as Abercorran Castle. When Henry I died, Anarchy occurred, and Gruffydd, and his sons, Lord Rhys in particular, gradually reconquered large parts of the former Deheubarth.

In 1154, the Anarchy was resolved when Henry II became king; two years later, Lord Rhys agreed peace terms with Henry II and prudently accepted that he would only rule Cantref Mawr, constructing Dinefwr Castle there. Henry II de-mobilised Flemish soldiers who had aided him during the Anarchy, settling them with the other Flemings.
From time to time, however, King Henry had occasion to go to Ireland, or Normandy, which Lord Rhys took as an opportunity to try and expand his own holdings. Returning from Ireland after one such occasion, in 1172, King Henry made peace with Lord Rhys, making him the justiciar of South Wales (ie. Deheubarth). By 1247, Laugharne was held by Guy de Bryan; this is the earliest reference to his family possessing the castle, and his father (also named Guy de Bryan) had only moved the family to Wales in 1219 (from Devon). Guy de Bryan's descendants continued to hold the castle; his namesake great-grandson was Lord High Admiral of England. The latter's daughter Elizabeth inherited the castle and married an Owen of St Bride's who subsequently took his name – Owen Laugharne – from the castle despite Gerald of Wales calling the castle Talachar, and other variations on Laugharne/Talacharn appearing in ancient charters; one anonymous pre-20th century writer erroneously claimed that the Owen Laugharne gave his name to the castle rather than the other way around. Possession subsequently defaulted to the Crown, and in 1575, Queen Elizabeth granted it to Sir John Perrot. In 1644 the castle was garrisoned for the king and taken for Parliament by Major-General Rowland Laugharne, who subsequently reverted to the king's side. The population in 1841 was 1,389.

Laugharne Corporation

Laugharne Corporation is an almost unique institution and, together with the City of London Corporation, the last surviving mediæval corporation in the United Kingdom. The Corporation was established in 1291 by Sir Guy de Brian, a Marcher Lord. Laugharne Corporation holds extensive historical records.
The Corporation is presided over by the Portreeve, wearing his traditional chain of gold cockle shells, (one added by each portreeve, with his name and date of tenure on the reverse), the Aldermen, and the body of Burgesses. The title of portreeve is conferred annually, with the Portreeve being sworn in on the first Monday after Michaelmas at the Big Court. The Corporation holds a court leet half-yearly formerly dealing with criminal cases, and a court baron every fortnight, dealing with civil suits within the lordship, especially in matters related to land, where administration of the common fields was dealt with. The Laugharne open-field system is one of only two surviving and still in use today in Britain.

'In Elizabeth's reign, the lordship passed to Sir John Perrott of Haroldston, a fact for which the inhabitants of Laugharne have had cause to regret. As at Carew Perrot modernised the castle, but he was the most unscrupulous "land-grabber" of his age, and in 1574 he induced the burgesses to part with three hundred acres of land in return for an annuity of £9 6s. 8d. The records say that "diverse burgesses of the said towne did not assent to same", and that it was "to the great decaying of many". It would be interesting to know by what methods of bribery or intimidation Sir John was able to accomplish his nefarious purposes.'

The most senior 76 burgesses get a strang of land on Hugden for life, to be used in a form of mediæval strip-farming.

The chief toast at the Portreeve's feast is "to the immortal memory of Sir Guido de Brian"; then the Recorder must sing the following song:

Governance
Since 1972, Laugharne Township Community Council has formed the lowest tier of local government for the town, represented by 11 community councillors.

For elections to Carmarthenshire County Council, Laugharne is covered by the Laugharne Township electoral ward, which also covers three neighbouring communities. The ward is represented by one county councillor. Independent councillor Jane Tremlett has represented the ward since 2004.

St Martin's Church 

It is thought that the church's original dedication was to St Michael, as it was reportedly referred to by this name in 1494 and 1849. Cist burials have reportedly been identified in the churchyard. A small, ornamented wheel-topped stone was reportedly excavated during grave-digging. At the time of the foundation borough of Laugharne, by a charter of 1278, the church belonging to the Rural Deanery of St Clears and a prebend of Winchester Cathedral. Before 1777 the churches of St Lawrence's Church, Marros and St Cyffic's Church, Cyffic were dependencies, but these both then became parish churches in their own right. In 1927 a medieval tile and what is thought to have been part of a canopied tomb were found in the churchyard. The churchyard's eighteenth and nineteenth century monuments in the churchyard are Grade II listed for their group value.

Inside the church is a shaped cross-slab dating from the Dark Ages, probably the 9th-10th century, built into the east wall of the south transept and has an unusual Celtic design carved onto it. Some historians claim the design is of Viking origin. There is thick ropework, in the form of looped interlacing, running up from the bottom to the cross-head. Close to the edges there is thinner knotwork. The large round-shaped cross-head has a Latin-style cross in the centre with a small boss in the middle of that and oval looped links between the arms.

The church is today part of the United Benefice of Bro Sancler. Welsh poet and playwright Dylan Thomas is buried in the churchyard, his grave marked by a white cross.

Landmarks

Local attractions include the 12th-century Laugharne Castle, Laugharne Town Hall and the estuary birdlife.

Laugharne Township currently has 69 listed buildings and contains several fine examples of Georgian townhouses including The Great House and Castle House together with Island House, parts of which date back to the Tudor period. All three properties are grade II* listed and a number of other early vernacular cottages have also survived.

There are a number of landmarks in Laugharne connected with the poet and writer Dylan Thomas. These include the Dylan Thomas Boathouse, where he lived with his family from 1949 to 1953, and now a museum; his writing shed; and the Dylan Thomas Birthday Walk, which was the setting for the work Poem in October.

In popular culture
Many scenes in the BBC Television series Keeping Faith (broadcast in Welsh as ) were filmed in and around Laugharne, referred to as Abercorran.

Laugharne weekend
The Laugharne Weekend, a three-day arts festival  held in the spring of 2007, featured writers such as Niall Griffiths and Patrick McCabe. Headline performers since then have included Ray Davies,  Will Self, Howard Marks and Patti Smith. The Millennium Hall is the main venue and smaller events are held locally such as in the Dylan Thomas Boathouse.

Notable people
Thomas Rede (ca.1390 – ca.1455), merchant, landholder, knight and public official of nearby Roche Castle 
Reginald Pecock (ca.1395 – ca.1461) prelate and writer, born in Laugharne
Sir John Perrot (1528–1592), Lord Deputy of Ireland, Lord President of Munster and Privy Councillor to Elizabeth I, lived in Laugharne Castle
Sir Thomas Perrot (1553–1594) Elizabethan courtier, soldier and Member of Parliament, lived in Laugharne Castle
Sir James Perrot (1571–1636) writer and Member of Parliament, lived in Laugharne.
Sir Sackville Crowe (1595–1671) English politician, lived in Laugharne.
Rowland Laugharne (1607–1675), Parliamentary General, his 1644 siege of the castle, a former family home, left it an uninhabitable ruin. 
Bishop William Thomas (1613–1689) Vicar of Laugharne, ejected by Cromwell. Later Bishop of St Davids and Bishop of Worcester.
Sir John Powell (1632/3–1696), judge who presided over the trial of the Seven Bishops in 1688, lived in Laugharne
Sir Thomas Powell (ca.1665 – 1720), lawyer and Member of Parliament, born in Laugharne
Griffith Jones (1684–1761), educational pioneer, curate of Laugharne where he also resided in later years
Bridget Bevan (1698–1779), also known as Madam Bevan, educationalist and philanthropist, lived in Laugharne
Josiah Tucker (1713–1799), clergyman, economist and political writer; Dean of Gloucester, born in Laugharne
Peter Williams (1723–1796) Methodist leader and publisher of Welsh language bibles born at West Marsh Farm in Laugharne 
Mary Wollstonecraft (1759–1797), writer, philosopher, and advocate of women's rights, lived in Laugharne as a child
James Augustus St. John (1795–1875), author and traveller, born in Laugharne 
Arnold Wienholt, Sr. (1826–1895), Australian politician, lived at Castle House in Laugharne
Edward Wienholt (1833–1904), Australian politician, lived at Castle House in Laugharne
Agnes Mason (1849–1941), nun, born in Laugharne
Joseph Arthur Hamilton Beresford (1861–1952), Australian naval commander, born in Laugharne
Caleb Rees (1883–1970) inspector of schools and author, lived at Island House in Laugharne from 1943 until his death  
William Charles Fuller VC (1884–1974), soldier, recipient of the Victoria Cross, born in Laugharne 
William Thomas David (1886–1948), Professor of Engineering at University College Cardiff and at the University of Leeds, born in Laugharne
Raymond Jeremy (1890-1969), violist, professor of violin and viola at the Royal Academy of Music, born in Laugharne
Richard Hughes (1900–1976), writer, lived at Castle House, instrumental in Dylan Thomas moving to Laugharne
Dylan Thomas (1914–1953), poet, lived in Laugharne and is buried in the churchyard
Derrick Childs (1918–1987, the Anglican Bishop of Monmouth and Archbishop of Wales, born in Laugharne.
Sir Kingsley Amis (1922–1995), novelist, poet and critic, wrote Booker Prize winner The Old Devils while living in Cliff House, Laugharne.
George Tremlett (born 1939), writer, former politician and bookshop owner, lives in Laugharne
Gary Pearce (born 1960), rugby union and rugby league player, born in Laugharne

Notes

References

External links
Laugharne Township Community Council
Laugharne Lines Heritage Website

 
Towns in Carmarthenshire
Carmarthen Bay
Populated coastal places in Wales